Hannah James may refer to:
 Hannah James (musician) is a musician, part of the duo Hannah James and Sam Sweeney
 Hannah James (tennis) is a former British tennis player -- see Aberdeen Cup
 Hannah James (actress), known for her roles on Mercy Street and Outlander